Night Train (Polish: Pociąg), also known as The Train, or Baltic Express, is a 1959 Polish film directed by Jerzy Kawalerowicz and starring Zbigniew Cybulski, Lucyna Winnicka and Leon Niemczyk. Night Train received numerous awards including the Georges Méliès award, and the Best Foreign Actress at the 1959 Venice Film Festival awarded to Lucyna Winnicka for her role as Marta in Night Train.

Plot
Two strangers, Jerzy (Leon Niemczyk) and Marta (Lucyna Winnicka), accidentally end up holding tickets for the same sleeping chamber on an overnight train to the Baltic Sea coast; and reluctantly agree to share the 2-bed single-gender compartment. Also on board is Marta's spurned lover Staszek (Zbigniew Cybulski), unwilling to accept her decision to break up after a short term affair, and leave her alone. When the police enter the train in search of a murderer on the lam, rumors fly and everything seems to point toward one of the main characters as the culprit.

Cast 
 Lucyna Winnicka - Marta
 Leon Niemczyk - Jerzy
 Zbigniew Cybulski - Staszek
 Teresa Szmigielówna - Lawyer's Wife
 Helena Dąbrowska - Train Controller
 Ignacy Machowski - Passenger
  - Murderer
 Aleksander Sewruk - Lawyer
 Zygmunt Zintel - Passenger Suffering from Insomnia
 Tadeusz Gwiazdowski - Train Controller
 Witold Skaruch - Priest
  - Passenger Flirting with Lawyer's Wife
  - Policeman

See also
Cinema of Poland
List of Polish language films

References

External links

1959 films
1950s mystery films
1959 crime films
Polish crime films
Polish mystery films
1950s Polish-language films
Films directed by Jerzy Kawalerowicz
Rail transport films